Ara(m)nthangi taluk is a taluk of Pudukkottai district of the Indian state of Tamil Nadu. The headquarters of the taluk is the town of Aranthangi

Demographics
According to the 2011 census, the taluk of Aranthangi had a population of 195798 with 95235  males and 100563 females. There were 1056 women for every 1000 men. The taluk had a literacy rate of 72.86. Child population in the age group below 6 was 10609 Males and 10101 Females.

References 

Taluks of Pudukkottai district